Neesenbeckia is a monotypic genus of flowering plants belonging to the family Cyperaceae. The only species is Neesenbeckia punctoria .

It is native to the Cape Provinces in South African.

The genus name of Neesenbeckia is in honour of Christian Gottfried Daniel Nees von Esenbeck (1776–1858), a prolific German botanist, physician, zoologist, and natural philosopher. The genus has one known synonym, Buekia . The Latin specific epithet of punctoria is derived from punctus meaning pricked, punctured or pierced. Both the genus and species were first described and published in J. S. African Bot. Vol.13 on page 74 in 1947.

References

Cyperaceae
Cyperaceae genera
Monotypic Poales genera
Plants described in 1947
Flora of the Cape Provinces